Dos Hermanas is a Spanish city  south of Seville in Andalusia, with a population of 131,317 as of 2015.

History 

The city's name, which means "two sisters", dates from its founding in 1248 by King Ferdinand III of Castile and honours Elvira and Estefanía Nazareno, the two sisters of Gonzalo Nazareno, one of the king's principal military commanders. For this reason natives of Dos Hermanas are called nazarenos/as.

In Tirso de Molina's play The Trickster of Seville and the Stone Guest (El burlador de Sevilla y convidado de piedra) (1612-1620), Dos Hermanas is mentioned as the place where Don Juan Tenorio manages to interpose himself in the marriage of two plebeians, Arminta and Batricio, whom he cleverly deceives. The Trickster of Seville and Stone Guest is the play from which the myth of "Don Juan" derives the name.

Economy 

The main economic activities of the city today are the production and distribution of olive oil and "Spanish olives", together with a significant number of service industries.

Transmitter 

At Dos Hermanas, south of Los Palacios, there is a powerful broadcasting mediumwave facility with a 232 metre tall guyed mast, used for the transmission of the first program of RNE with 300 kW on 684 kHz. The transmitter, which is most often designated as "RNE-1 Sevilla" can be received easily at night throughout Europe and northern Africa.

Notable people 

The members of Spanish lounge music duo Los del Río (known for their international hit single, Macarena) are natives of Dos Hermanas and still reside in the city.

Spanish popstar Melody comes from Dos Hermanas. In 2014 a controversy was sparked when an interviewer for Cuatro TV asked her how come she spoke so well 'in spite of coming from Dos Hermanas'. This sparked a large debate on classism and Madrid-centric snobbery.

Sports 

Its football club, Dos Hermanas CF, was founded in 1971. It plays in the Primera Andaluza, the highest league in the region. It has had four spells playing in national leagues, including the third tier, the Segunda B, between 1999 and 2002. It returned to regional football in 2010.

References

External links 

  Official city council site

Municipalities of the Province of Seville
1248 establishments in Europe
13th-century establishments in Castile